Ouffouédiékro is a village in central Ivory Coast. It is in the sub-prefecture of Lolobo in the Attiégouakro Department of the  Autonomous District of Yamoussoukro.

Ouffouédiékro was a commune until March 2012, when it became one of 1126 communes nationwide that were abolished.

Notes

Former communes of Ivory Coast
Populated places in Yamoussoukro